Thomas Sabitzer (born 12 October 2000) is an Austrian professional footballer who plays as a winger for WSG Tirol on loan from LASK.

Club career
He made his Austrian Football First League debut for Kapfenberger SV on 25 August 2017 in a game against Hartberg.

On 1 June 2021, he joined WSG Tirol on a season-long loan.

Personal life
Sabitzer is the cousin of the footballer Marcel Sabitzer.

Career statistics

Club

References

External links
 

2000 births
Living people
Austrian footballers
Kapfenberger SV players
FC Juniors OÖ players
LASK players
WSG Tirol players
2. Liga (Austria) players
Austrian Football Bundesliga players
Association football midfielders